"Reaper" is a song from Australian singer and songwriter Sia's seventh studio album This Is Acting (2016). The song was co-written by Sia, Kanye West, Noah Goldstein, Charles Misodi Njapa (better known by his stage name 88-Keys), and Dom $olo, originally for Rihanna's album Anti (2016). "Reaper" was co-produced by West, Dom $olo, Goldstein, 88-Keys, Jesse Shatkin, and Jake Sinclair. Sia and West had previously collaborated on the latter's song "Wolves".

The song was released as the fourth promotional single from This Is Acting on 29 May 2017.

Background and promotion
In November 2013, Kanye West began working on his seventh studio album, with the working title of So Help Me God intended for a 2014 release date. During these sessions, a 5-minute freestyle would be recorded titled "After You", which later would be used as the basis for "Reaper", and Pusha T's 2019 single "Coming Home" featuring Ms. Lauryn Hill. A pop track, the song heavily samples Roberta Flack's "After You."

In January 2016, Sia revealed the track listing for This Is Acting by having theaters around the world display songs and track numbers on their marquees. The songs "Reaper" and "House on Fire" were confirmed as the seventh and eighth tracks, respectively, on the marquee of Webster Hall, which is located near Astor Place, in the East Village of Manhattan, New York City. "Reaper" was released as a promotional single that month.

Sia said of "Reaper", "I don't care about the song. I know in print that will look bad, but what I mean is I'm not emotionally attached to it. I thought it was a fun song. I think it's a good, fun song, but I didn't anticipate it being on the record."

Sia performed the song on Good Morning America.

Reception
Alex Kritselis of Bustle wrote, "After hearing "Reaper" — a mid-tempo, sunshine-y anthem about... cheating death? — it's easy to understand Sia's indifference. It's a catchy tune, sure — but it doesn't make much of an impact. I'm not at all surprised Rihanna passed on it. (It's not a bad song, by any means, but it's just kinda... there.)"

The song peaked at #23 in France (SNEP) and has garnered over 60 million Spotify streams.

Charts

References

External links
 

2016 songs
Sia (musician) songs
Song recordings produced by Jesse Shatkin
Song recordings produced by Kanye West
Songs written by Kanye West
Songs written by Sia (musician)